Pak Kyong-chol is a North Korean former footballer. He represented North Korea on at least five occasions between 1991 and 1998. He was also part of the squad at the 1998 Asian Games.

Career statistics

International

References

Date of birth unknown
Living people
North Korean footballers
North Korea international footballers
Association football goalkeepers
Footballers at the 1998 Asian Games
Asian Games competitors for North Korea
Year of birth missing (living people)